Baron  was an admiral of the early modern Imperial Japanese Navy.

Biography
Tomioka was the eldest son of a samurai in the service of Matsushiro Domain, in what is now part of Nagano Prefecture.

In September 1876, Tomioka enrolled in the 5th class of the Imperial Japanese Naval Academy and graduated at the top of his class. In 1878 he was sent as a cadet to serve on the Royal Navy warship HMS Audacious. After his return to Japan, he graduated from the Navy Staff College. During the First Sino-Japanese War, Tomioka served as executive officer on the cruiser . He subsequently served as captain of the dispatch ship , instructor at the Imperial Japanese Naval Academy, captain of the cruiser  and of the battleship  and director of the 1st Bureau of the Imperial Japanese Navy General Staff.

Tomioka was promoted to rear admiral in July 1903. During the Russo-Japanese War, he was on the same strategy planning team as Akiyama Saneyuki, and served as commandant of the Imperial Japanese Naval Academy. After the war, he was made commander in chief of the Training Fleet and promoted to vice admiral in March 1907.

Tomioka was ennobled with the title of baron (danshaku) under the kazoku peerage system in September 1907. After serving as commander in chief of the Takeshiki Guard District and the Ryojun Guard District, he entered the reserves in December 1911.

From 1914 until his death in July 1917, Tomioka was vice-chairman of the Imperial Serviceman’s Association.  His son Sadatoshi Tomioka was also an admiral, serving in World War II.

References

External links

Notes 

1854 births
1917 deaths
People from Nagano Prefecture
Imperial Japanese Navy admirals
Kazoku
Japanese military personnel of the First Sino-Japanese War
Japanese military personnel of the Russo-Japanese War
People of Meiji-period Japan